John Pagano (born March 30, 1967) is an American football coach and most recently the outside linebackers coach for the Denver Broncos of the National Football League (NFL). He previously served as an assistant coach for the Houston Texans, Oakland Raiders, San Diego Chargers, Indianapolis Colts and New Orleans Saints. He is the younger brother of Chuck Pagano.

Early life
Pagano was born and raised in Boulder, Colorado. An all-state linebacker at Fairview High School, he played at Colorado Mesa University from 1985–88, earning a degree in business marketing.

Coaching career

San Diego Chargers

Pagano originally joined the Chargers in 2002 as the team's quality control coach for the defense and moved his way up the ranks, first as an assistant linebackers coach, then as the outside linebackers coach and linebackers coach before being promoted to defensive coordinator on January 5, 2012.

Since Pagano first started working with the team’s linebackers in 2005, a player from that group led the team in tackles and sacks every season, including Shaun Phillips who paced the squad in 2012 with 9.5. Pagano also worked closely with Shawne Merriman, who led the NFL in sacks in 2006, was selected to play in three Pro Bowls and won the NFL’s Defensive Rookie of the Year Award in 2005.

In Pagano's first year as a coordinator, the Chargers scored a total of seven defensive touchdowns in 2012, second in the NFL to the Chicago Bears (12), and two shy of the team record set by the 1961 squad that returned nine interceptions for touchdowns. The 2012 Chargers returned five interceptions and two fumbles for scores. The Chargers also increased their sack total, going from 32 in 2011 to 38 in 2012, including a team-record-tying 11-sack performance in a Dec 23 win against the New York Jets.

Oakland Raiders

On January 23, 2017, Pagano agreed to become the Assistant Head Coach/Defense for the Oakland Raiders.

On November 21, 2017, following the Raiders' Week 11 loss to the Patriots, and with the defense having failed to intercept a pass, defensive coordinator Ken Norton Jr. was fired. Pagano then took over defensive coordinator duties. The Raiders had their first interception in Week 12 against the Denver Broncos in a 21–14 win, being picked off by NaVorro Bowman.

Houston Texans

On January 26, 2018, Pagano was hired as a senior defensive assistant for the Houston Texans.

Denver Broncos

On January 30, 2020, Pagano was hired as an outside linebackers coach for the Denver Broncos.

Personal life
Pagano and his wife Kimberly have two sons, Jagger and Brody.

His older brother, Chuck Pagano, is the former head coach of the Indianapolis Colts.  The Pagano brothers both played for their father, Sam, who spent 26 years as the head coach at Fairview High. Sam also coached internationally in Taiwan, Germany, France and Italy.

Pagano's nephew, Carlo Kemp, is an American football player for the Pittsburgh Maulers of the United States Football League.

References

External links
 Houston Texans profile

1967 births
Living people
Denver Broncos coaches
Houston Texans coaches
Indianapolis Colts coaches
Colorado Mesa Mavericks football coaches
Colorado Mesa Mavericks football players
Louisiana Tech Bulldogs football coaches
National Football League defensive coordinators
New Orleans Saints coaches
Oakland Raiders coaches
Ole Miss Rebels football coaches
San Diego Chargers coaches
UNLV Rebels football coaches
High school football coaches in Colorado
Sportspeople from Boulder, Colorado
Players of American football from Colorado